"I Gotta Kick Start Now" is the second single by Vamps, released on March 13, 2009. It includes a cover of the 1994 song "Trouble" by Shampoo. The limited edition came with a DVD that includes the music video for the title track and its making of. The single reached number 6 on the Oricon chart.

Track listing

References 

2009 singles
Japanese rock songs
Songs written by Hyde (musician)
2009 songs